The final of the 2007 OFC Champions League were played between Waitakere United of New Zealand and Ba F.C. of Fiji.

The first leg was played in the Govind Park, Ba, Fiji on the April 21, 2007. The home team won 2–1.

The second leg was played in the Mt Smart Stadium, Auckland, New Zealand on the April 29, 2007. Waitakere United won 1–0, Allan Pearce scored the away goal that the home team needed to win the Champions League and qualify for the 2007 FIFA Club World Cup.

Match summaries

 

|}

First leg

Referee:
 Job Ponis Minan  

Assistant referees:
 Mahit Chilia 
 Michael Joseph
Fourth official:
 Lencie Fred

Second leg

References
OceaniaFootball

OFC Champions League finals